Al-Jarw is a sub-district located in As Sawma'ah District, Al Bayda Governorate, Yemen. Al-Jarw had a population of 2004 according to the 2004 census.

References 

Sub-districts in As Sawma'ah District